George Thomson may refer to:

Government and politics
 George Thomson (MP for Southwark) (c. 1607–1691), English merchant and Parliamentarian soldier, official and politician
 George Thomson, Baron Thomson of Monifieth (1921–2008), Scottish politician; former Labour MP and peer
 George Thomson (Canadian politician) (1855–1920), Scottish-born merchant, official and political figure in British Columbia
 George Walker Thomson (1883–1949), Scottish trade unionist
 George Thomson, Lord Thomson (1893–1962), Scottish politician and judge

Sports
 George Thomson (footballer, born 1854) (1854–1937), Wales international footballer
 George Thomson (rugby) (1856–1899), English rugby union footballer who played in the 1870s and 1880s
 George C. Thomson (1888–1976), American football player, lawyer and banker
 George Thomson (footballer, born 1936) (1936–2007), Scottish footballer (Hearts, Everton, Brentford)
 George Thomson (Scottish footballer) (fl. 1930s, Aberdeen)
 George Thomson (footballer, born 1992), English footballer

Military
 George Pirie Thomson (1887–1965), British naval officer and press censor
 George Thomson (RAF officer) (1896–1918), Canadian World War I flying ace
 George Edwin Thomson (1897–1918), British World War I flying ace

Other
 George Thomson (physician) (c. 1619–1676), English physician, medical writer and pamphleteer
 George Thomson (musician) (1757–1851), Scottish musician; collector of the music of Scotland
 George Thomson (shipbuilder) (1815–1866), Scottish engineer and shipbuilder
 George Thomson (botanist) (1819–1878), Scottish missionary and plant collector
 George Thomson (naturalist) (1848–1933), New Zealand scientist, educationalist, social worker and politician
 George Paget Thomson (1892–1975), English physicist and Nobel laureate
 George Derwent Thomson (1903–1987), English Marxist philosopher; Greek and Irish scholar
 George Malcolm Thomson (1899–1996), Scottish journalist, author and nationalist
 George Thomson (rose breeder), Scottish-born Australian rose breeder
 George Sutherland Thomson (1871–1958) dairy expert
 George Ritchie Thomson (1865–1946), Scottish military surgeon and expert on tropical medicine

See also
 George Thompson (disambiguation)